Robert Vernon Ply (August 13, 1940 – May 18, 2022) was an American collegiate and professional football player who played defensive back in the  American Football League. He played six seasons, for the Dallas Texans/Kansas City Chiefs, the Buffalo Bills, and the Denver Broncos.

He died at the age of 81 on May 18, 2022, in Raytown, Missouri.

See also
 Other American Football League players

References

1940 births
American football defensive backs
Players of American football from Texas
People from Mission, Texas
Baylor Bears football players
Dallas Texans (AFL) players
Denver Broncos (AFL) players
Buffalo Bills players
Living people
American football quarterbacks
American Football League players
Kansas City Chiefs players